The 31st Saturn Awards, honoring the best in science fiction, fantasy and horror film and television in 2004, were held on May 3, 2005 at the Universal City Hilton Hotel in Los Angeles, California, United States.

Below is a complete list of nominees and winners. Winners are highlighted in bold.

Winners and nominees

Film
{| class=wikitable
|-
! style="background:#EEDD82; width:50%" | Best Sci-Fi Film
! style="background:#EEDD82; width:50%" | Best Fantasy Film
|-
| valign="top" |
Eternal Sunshine of the Spotless Mind
The Butterfly Effect
The Day After Tomorrow
The Forgotten
I, Robot
Sky Captain and the World of Tomorrow
| valign="top" |
Spider-Man 2
Birth
Harry Potter and the Prisoner of Azkaban
Hellboy
Lemony Snicket's A Series of Unfortunate Events
House of Flying Daggers
|-
! style="background:#EEDD82; width:50%" | Best Horror Film
! style="background:#EEDD82; width:50%" | Best Action/Adventure/Thriller Film
|-
| valign="top" |
Shaun of the Dead
Blade: Trinity
Dawn of the Dead
The Grudge
Open Water
Saw
Van Helsing
| valign="top" |
Kill Bill: Volume 2
The Aviator
The Bourne Supremacy
Collateral
The Manchurian Candidate
National Treasure
The Phantom of the Opera
|-
! style="background:#EEDD82; width:50%" | Best Animated Film
! style="background:#EEDD82; width:50%" | Best Actor
|-
| valign="top" |
The Incredibles
The Polar Express
Shark Tale
Shrek 2
| valign="top" |
Tobey Maguire – Spider-Man 2 as Peter Parker/Spider-Man
Christian Bale – The Machinist as Trevor Reznik
Jim Carrey – Eternal Sunshine of the Spotless Mind as Joel Barish
Tom Cruise – Collateral as Vincent
Matt Damon – The Bourne Supremacy as Jason Bourne
Johnny Depp – Finding Neverland as J.M. Barrie
|-
! style="background:#EEDD82; width:50%" | Best Actress
! style="background:#EEDD82; width:50%" | Best Supporting Actor
|-
| valign="top" |
Blanchard Ryan – Open Water as Susan Watkins
Nicole Kidman – Birth as Anna
Julianne Moore – The Forgotten as Telly Paretta
Uma Thurman – Kill Bill: Volume 2 as The Bride/Beatrix Kiddo
Kate Winslet – Eternal Sunshine of the Spotless Mind as Clementine Kruczinsky
Zhang Ziyi – House of Flying Daggers as Mei
| valign="top" |
David Carradine – Kill Bill: Volume 2 as Bill
Alfred Molina – Spider-Man 2 as Otto Octavius/Doctor Octopus
Gary Oldman – Harry Potter and the Prisoner of Azkaban as Sirius Black
Giovanni Ribisi – Sky Captain and the World of Tomorrow as Dex
Liev Schreiber – The Manchurian Candidate as Congressman Raymond Prentiss Shaw
John Turturro – Secret Window as John Shooter
|-
! style="background:#EEDD82; width:50%" | Best Supporting Actress
! style="background:#EEDD82; width:50%" | Best Young Actor/Actress
|-
| valign="top" |
Daryl Hannah – Kill Bill: Volume 2 as Elle Driver
Kim Basinger – Cellular as Jessica Martin
Irma P. Hall – The Ladykillers as Marva Munson
Angelina Jolie – Sky Captain and the World of Tomorrow as Commander Fransesca "Franky" Cook
Diane Kruger – National Treasure as Abigail Chase
Meryl Streep – The Manchurian Candidate as Senator Eleanor Prentiss Shaw
| valign="top" |
Emmy Rossum – The Phantom of the Opera as Christine Daaé
Cameron Bright – Birth as Sean
Perla Haney-Jardine – Kill Bill: Volume 2 as B.B.
Freddie Highmore – Finding Neverland as Peter Llewelyn Davies
Jonathan Jackson – Riding the Bullet as Alan Parker
Daniel Radcliffe – Harry Potter and the Prisoner of Azkaban as Harry Potter
|-
! style="background:#EEDD82; width:50%" | Best Director
! style="background:#EEDD82; width:50%" | Best Screenplay
|-
| valign="top" |
Sam Raimi – Spider-Man 2
Alfonso Cuarón – Harry Potter and the Prisoner of Azkaban
Michel Gondry – Eternal Sunshine of the Spotless Mind
Michael Mann – Collateral
Quentin Tarantino – Kill Bill: Volume 2
Zhang Yimou – House of Flying Daggers
| valign="top" |
Alvin Sargent – Spider-Man 2
Stuart Beattie – Collateral
Brad Bird – The Incredibles
Charlie Kaufman – Eternal Sunshine of the Spotless Mind
Steve Kloves – Harry Potter and the Prisoner of Azkaban
Quentin Tarantino – Kill Bill: Volume 2
|-
! style="background:#EEDD82; width:50%" | Best Score
! style="background:#EEDD82; width:50%" | Best Costume Design
|-
| valign="top" |Alan SilvestriVan HelsingThe Polar Express
Danny Elfman – Spider-Man 2
Michael Giacchino – The Incredibles
Edward Shearmur – Sky Captain and the World of Tomorrow
John Williams – Harry Potter and the Prisoner of Azkaban
| valign="top" |Kevin Conran – Sky Captain and the World of TomorrowAlexandra Byrne – The Phantom of the Opera
Wendy Partridge – Hellboy
Gabriella Pescucci, Carlo Poggioli – Van Helsing
Jany Temime – Harry Potter and the Prisoner of Azkaban
Emi Wada – House of Flying Daggers
|-
! style="background:#EEDD82; width:50%" | Best Make-Up
! style="background:#EEDD82; width:50%" | Best Visual Effects
|-
| valign="top" |Jake Garber, Matt Rose, Mike Elizalde – HellboyDavid LeRoy Anderson, Mario Cacioppo – Dawn of the Dead
Greg Cannom, Steve LaPorte – Van Helsing
Nick Dudman, Amanda Knight – Harry Potter and the Prisoner of Azkaban
Paul Jones – Resident Evil: Apocalypse
Valli O'Reilly, Bill Corso – Lemony Snicket's A Series of Unfortunate Events
| valign="top" |John Dykstra, Scott Stokdyk, Anthony LaMolinara, John Frazier – Spider-Man 2'Peter Chiang, Pablo Helman, Thomas J. Smith – The Chronicles of RiddickKaren E. Goulekas, Neil Corbould, Greg Strause, Remo Balcells – The Day After TomorrowRoger Guyett, Tim Burke, Bill George, John Richardson – Harry Potter and the Prisoner of AzkabanJohn Nelson, Andrew R. Jones, Erik Nash, Joe Letteri – I, RobotScott Squires, Ben Snow, Daniel Jeannette, Syd Dutton – Van Helsing|}

Television
Programs

Acting

DVD

Special awards
Special Recognition Award
 The Star Trek franchise from 1987 to 2005 (Star Trek: The Next Generation, Star Trek: Deep Space Nine, Star Trek: Voyager and Star Trek: Enterprise'')

Filmmaker's Showcase Award
Kerry Conran

Life Career Award
Stephen J. Cannell
Tom Rothman

Service Award
Bill Liebowitz (Posthumously)

External links
 The Official Saturn Awards Site
 The Official Saturn Awards Site Archive of Nominations and Winners for 2004

Saturn Awards ceremonies
Saturn
Saturn
2005 in California